The Serbian Cyrillic alphabet is a variation of the Cyrillic script used to write the Serbian language, updated in 1818 by the Serbian philologist and linguist Vuk Karadžić. It is one of the two alphabets used to write modern standard Serbian, the other being Gaj's Latin alphabet.

Karadžić based his alphabet on the previous Slavonic-Serbian script, following the principle of "write as you speak and read as it is written", removing obsolete letters and letters representing iotified vowels, introducing  from the Latin alphabet instead, and adding several consonant letters for sounds specific to Serbian phonology. During the same period, linguists led by Ljudevit Gaj adapted the Latin alphabet, in use in western South Slavic areas, using the same principles. As a result of this joint effort, Serbian Cyrillic and Gaj's Latin alphabets for Serbian-Croatian have a complete one-to-one congruence, with the Latin digraphs Lj, Nj, and Dž counting as single letters.

Karadžić's Cyrillic alphabet was officially adopted in the Principality of Serbia in 1868, and was in exclusive use in the country up to the interwar period. Both alphabets were official in the Kingdom of Yugoslavia and later in the Socialist Federal Republic of Yugoslavia. Due to the shared cultural area, Gaj's Latin alphabet saw a gradual adoption in the Socialist Republic of Serbia since, and both scripts are used to write modern standard Serbian. In Serbia, Cyrillic is seen as being more traditional, and has the official status (designated in the constitution as the "official script", compared to Latin's status of "script in official use" designated by a lower-level act, for national minorities). It is also an official script in Bosnia and Herzegovina and Montenegro, along with Gaj's Latin.

Official use
Serbian Cyrillic is in official use in Serbia, Montenegro, and Bosnia and Herzegovina. Although Bosnia "officially accept[s] both alphabets", the Latin script is almost always used in the Federation of Bosnia and Herzegovina, whereas Cyrillic is in everyday use in Republika Srpska. The Serbian language in Croatia is officially recognized as a minority language; however, the use of Cyrillic in bilingual signs has sparked protests and vandalism.

Serbian Cyrillic is an important symbol of Serbian identity. In Serbia, official documents are printed in Cyrillic only even though, according to a 2014 survey, 47% of the Serbian population write in the Latin alphabet whereas 36% write in Cyrillic.

Modern alphabet

The following table provides the upper and lower case forms of the Serbian Cyrillic alphabet, along with the equivalent forms in the Serbian Latin alphabet and the International Phonetic Alphabet (IPA) value for each letter. The letters do not have names, and consonants are normally pronounced as such when spelling is necessary (or followed by a short schwa, e.g. /fə/).:

 

Summary tables

Early history

Early Cyrillic

According to tradition, Glagolitic was invented by the Byzantine Christian missionaries and brothers Saints Cyril and Methodius in the 860s, amid the Christianization of the Slavs. Glagolitic alphabet appears to be older, predating the introduction of Christianity, only formalized by Cyril and expanded to cover non-Greek sounds. The Glagolitic alphabet was gradually superseded in later centuries by the Cyrillic script, developed around by Cyril's disciples, perhaps at the Preslav Literary School at the end of the 9th century.

The earliest form of Cyrillic was the ustav, based on Greek uncial script, augmented by ligatures and letters from the Glagolitic alphabet for consonants not found in Greek. There was no distinction between capital and lowercase letters. The standard language was based on the Slavic dialect of Thessaloniki.

Medieval Serbian Cyrillic

Part of the Serbian literary heritage of the Middle Ages are works such as Miroslav Gospel, Vukan Gospels, St. Sava's Nomocanon, Dušan's Code, Munich Serbian Psalter, and others. The first printed book in Serbian was the Cetinje Octoechos (1494).

Karadžić's reform

Vuk Stefanović Karadžić  fled Serbia during the Serbian Revolution in 1813, to Vienna. There he met Jernej Kopitar, a linguist with interest in slavistics. Kopitar and Sava Mrkalj helped Vuk to reform Serbian and its orthography. He finalized the alphabet in 1818 with the Serbian Dictionary.

Karadžić reformed standard Serbian and standardised the Serbian Cyrillic alphabet by following strict phonemic principles on the Johann Christoph Adelung' model and Jan Hus' Czech alphabet. Karadžić's reforms of standard Serbian modernised it and distanced it from Serbian and Russian Church Slavonic, instead bringing it closer to common folk speech, specifically, to the dialect of Eastern Herzegovina which he spoke. Karadžić was, together with Đuro Daničić, the main Serbian signatory to the Vienna Literary Agreement of 1850 which, encouraged by Austrian authorities, laid the foundation for Serbian, various forms of which are used by Serbs in Serbia, Montenegro, Bosnia and Herzegovina and Croatia today. Karadžić also translated the New Testament into Serbian, which was published in 1868.

He wrote several books; Mala prostonarodna slaveno-serbska pesnarica and Pismenica serbskoga jezika in 1814, and two more in 1815 and 1818, all with the alphabet still in progress. In his letters from 1815-1818 he used: Ю, Я, Ы and Ѳ. In his 1815 song book he dropped the Ѣ.

The alphabet was officially adopted in 1868, four years after his death.

From the Old Slavic script Vuk retained these 24 letters:

He added one Latin letter:

And 5 new ones:

He removed:

Modern history

Austria-Hungary
Orders issued on the 3 and 13 October 1914 banned the use of Serbian Cyrillic in the Kingdom of Croatia-Slavonia, limiting it for use in religious instruction. A decree was passed on January 3, 1915, that banned Serbian Cyrillic completely from public use. An imperial order in October 25, 1915, banned the use of Serbian Cyrillic in the Condominium of Bosnia and Herzegovina, except "within the scope of Serbian Orthodox Church authorities".

World War II

In 1941, the Nazi puppet Independent State of Croatia banned the use of Cyrillic, having regulated it on 25 April 1941, and in June 1941 began eliminating "Eastern" (Serbian) words from Croatian, and shut down Serbian schools.

The Serbian Cyrillic alphabet was used as a basis for the Macedonian alphabet with the work of Krste Misirkov and Venko Markovski.

Yugoslavia
The Serbian Cyrillic script was one of the two official scripts used to write Serbo-Croatian in Yugoslavia since its establishment in 1918, the other being Gaj's Latin alphabet (latinica).

Following the breakup of Yugoslavia in the 1990s, Serbian Cyrillic is no longer used in Croatia on national level, while in Serbia, Bosnia and Herzegovina, and Montenegro it remained an official script.

Contemporary period

Under the Constitution of Serbia of 2006, Cyrillic script is the only one in official use.

Special letters 
The ligatures:
 were developed specially for the Serbian alphabet.

 Karadžić based  on letter "Gea" in the Old Serbian Cyrillic alphabet.
  was adopted by Karadžić to represent the voiceless alveolo-palatal affricate.
Karadžić adopted a design by Serbian poet, prose writer, polyglot, and Serbian Orthodox bishop Lukijan Mušicki for the letter . It was based on the letter , as adapted by Karadžić.

Differences from other Cyrillic alphabets

 
Serbian Cyrillic does not use several letters encountered in other Slavic Cyrillic alphabets. It does not use hard sign and soft sign, but the aforementioned soft-sign ligatures instead. The letter  is not used.

The regular (upright) shapes are generally standardized among languages and there are no officially recognized variations. That presents a challenge in Unicode modeling, as the glyphs differ only in italic versions, and historically non-italic letters have been used in the same code positions. Serbian professional typography uses fonts specially crafted for the language to overcome the problem, but texts printed from common computers contain East Slavic rather than Serbian italic glyphs. Cyrillic fonts from Adobe, Microsoft (Windows Vista and later) and a few other font houses include the Serbian variations (both regular and italic).

If the underlying font and Web technology provides support, the proper glyphs can be obtained by marking the text with appropriate language codes. Thus, in non-italic mode:
 <span lang="sr">бгдпт</span>, produces in  language script: , same (except for the shape of б) as 
 <span lang="ru">бгдпт</span>, producing  in  language script: 
whereas:
 <span lang="sr" style="font-style: italic">бгдпт</span> gives in  language script: , and 
 <span lang="ru" style="font-style: italic">бгдпт</span> produces in  language script: .

Since Unicode unifies different glyphs in same characters, font support must be present to display the correct variant. Programs like Mozilla Firefox, LibreOffice (currently under Linux only), and some others provide required OpenType support. Of course, font families like Fira, Noto, Overpass, PT Fonts, Liberation, Gentium, Open Sans, Lato, IBM Plex Serif, Croscore fonts, GNU FreeFont, DejaVu, Ubuntu, Microsoft "C*" fonts from Windows Vista and above must be used.

Keyboard layout

The standard Serbian keyboard layout for personal computers is as follows:

See also
 Gaj's Latin alphabet
 Yugoslav braille
 Yugoslav manual alphabet

 Romanization of Serbian
 Serbian calligraphy

References

Citations

Sources 

 
 
 
 
 Sir Duncan Wilson, The life and times of Vuk Stefanović Karadžić, 1787-1864: literacy, literature and national independence in Serbia, p. 387. Clarendon Press, 1970. Google Books

External links
 Omniglot – Serbian and Croatian

Cyrillic alphabets
Alphabet
Cyrillic alphabet
1818 introductions
Writing systems introduced in the 19th century